Voknavolok is a rural locality (a selo) under the administrative jurisdiction of the Town of Kostomuksha of the Republic of Karelia, Russia. Population:

Nineteenth-century Vuokkiniemi 

The census of 1800 put the population of the parish of Vuokkiniemi at 853; by 1900, it stood at 3265. A large proportion of the population was, or was descended from, migrants from Finland: around 1890, 34% of the population descended from migrants from Ostrobothnia, 25% from Kainuu, and 18% from Finnish Karelia, while statistics from 1902–8 show no evidence from Russian or Russian-speaking identity. The economy of the parish was a mixed subsistence economy of a kind found widely in subarctic Eurasia, including livestock-rearing; slash-and-burn agriculture (though this was circumscribed to varying degrees by law) and agriculture in the co-operative mir-system, focused on barley, rye, potatoes and turnips; local freshwater fishing, along with wage-labour for fishing companies on the Arctic Sea; hunting (until an 1892 ban on trapping); itinerant trading, especially west into Finland, primarily selling furs, netting thread, hemp, mutton, fish, butter and birds and purchasing flour and salt; and itinerant begging. A postal route between Vuokkiniemi and Suomussalmi commenced in 1898.

An Orthodox Christian chapel (tsasouna) had been built in Vuokkiniemi by the 1780s, at which time the parish gained independent status within the organised church, and a church was built in 1804. By 1881, chapels had been built in other villages in the same parish—Vuonninen, Venehjärvi, Kivijärvi, and Latvajärvi. However, official influence on the local religion was limited: official religion used the Russian language, it was common that there was no priest in the parish in the earlier nineteenth century, and even in the 1880s a priest might tour the surrounding chapels only twice a year. Many people in Vuokkiniemi thus belonged to various sects of the Old Believers. Their Christianity was deeply infused with originally non-Christian traditions, including a prominent role for the sages known as tietäjät. Laestadianism grew prominent around the 1890s.

In 1832 Elias Lönnroth estimated that less than one percent of Vuokkiniemi's peasants could read. Throughout the nineteenth century, however, they sustained a vigorous tradition of Karelian-language oral poetry, including epics, laments, incantations (including the aetiological myths known as synnyt). Indeed, Vuokkiniemi and its surrounding villages and parishes became the celebrated centre of much collecting of Finnic-language folklore, which inspired the Kalevala and much of the Finnish and Karelian nationalist movements. In the century following the first written record of a poetic text from Vuokkiniemi, made by Zachris Topelius the Elder in 23 January 1821, inhabitants of Vuokkiniemi contributed at least 2960 folklore texts to the collections of the Finnish Literature Society, many later published in the voluminous Suomen kansan vanhat runot. Key collectors were Elias Lönnroth, Axel Borenius, Samuli Paulaharju, and Iivo Marttinen.

References

Rural localities in the Republic of Karelia
Kostomuksha
Kemsky Uyezd